Women for Refugee Women is a charity challenging the injustices experienced by women who seek asylum in the United Kingdom.

Work 
Women for Refugee Women provide a welcoming and safe space for asylum-seeking women to come together in solidarity for English lessons, exercise classes and other confidence-building group sessions.

Women for Refugee Women have supported female refugees from a variety of countries, with many having experienced abuse, loss or trauma, destitution and mental illness.

The organisation also campaigns alongside female refugees against injustices they face whilst in the UK, including conditions in detention centres. This includes publishing research and briefing politicians  to try and create a fairer asylum process. 

Around 2,000 women who come to the UK seeking asylum are detained in immigration detention centres every year. In 2017, Women for Refugee Women published research which found that the majority of women detained in Yarl's Wood are survivors of sexual and gender-based violence, which is in breach of the UK government's own policies on protecting 'adults at risk'.

Women for Refugee Women also works with the arts, media and public events to document and raise awareness about women's stories. In 2016, Women for Refugee Women produced a short animated film, directed by Priya Sundram, which documents and raises awareness about the experiences of women who have survived sexual violence and torture, and are currently detained in Yarl's Wood.

References

External links

Women's organisations based in the United Kingdom
Refugee aid organisations in the United Kingdom